Rabbi Samuel ben Moses de Medina (abbreviated RaShDaM,  or Maharashdam; 1505 – October 12, 1589), was a Talmudist and author from Thessaloniki. He was principal of the Talmudic college of that city, which produced a great number of prominent scholars during the 16th and 17th centuries. His teachers were the noted Talmudists Joseph Taitazak and Levi Ibn Chaviv, and among his schoolmates were Isaac Adarbi, Joseph ibn Leb, and Moses Almosnino. While on a mission to Constantinople he met the noted grammarian Menahem Lonzano, who studied under him for some time and who therefore speaks of him as his teacher (David Conforte, Kore ha-Dorot, ed. Cassel, p. 44a).

Among Samuel's many disciples who attained prominence were Abraham de Boton, Joseph ibn Ezra and Ḥayyim Shabbethai. He had a controversy with Joseph Karo and other rabbis at Safed, against whom he wrote a polemical letter (Ketav Tochachah). He died at Salonica.  A grandson of his was Samuel Hayyun, author of Bene Shemuel, novellae and responsa (Salonica, c. 1613).

Writings
Samuel's works include:

Ben Shemuel, Mantua, 1622, thirty sermons on various subjects, published with a preface by his grandson Shemaiah
Hiddushim (unpublished), novellae on some Talmudic tractates
a collection of 956 responsa in four parts, of which the first two were published during the lifetime of the author (1578-87?) under the title Piske RaShDaM

A complete edition of the last-named work was undertaken later by the author's son Moses, who added a preface

References

 Its bibliography:
Moritz Steinschneider, Cat. Bodl. No. 8909;
Joseph Zedner, Cat. Hebr. Books Brit. Mus. s.v.

1505 births
1589 deaths
16th-century rabbis from the Ottoman Empire
Rabbis from Thessaloniki
Rosh yeshivas
Authors of books on Jewish law